The siglum Taylor-Schechter 12.182 (T-S 12.182; also referenced as TM nr. 62326; LDAB id: 3490; Rahlfs 2005)  designates a manuscript written on parchment in codex form. This is a palimpsest of a copy of Origen's work called the Hexapla. The manuscript is dated to 7th-century AD, and is the oldest of the hexapla manuscripts. The hexapla was completed before 240 CE.

History 
The fragments comes from Egypt, were published by C. Taylor in his work Hebrew-Greek Cairo Genizah Palimpsests, Cambridge, 1900, pp. 54–65.

Description 
This is palimpsest in codex form written on parchment. It contains Psalms 22 (LXX 21): 15-18 fol. A recto, 19-24 and 25-28 fol. B verso, and the middle columns, 2-5 columns of the Hexapla.

Tetragrammaton ΠΙΠΙ 
The manuscript is written in koine Greek, and the divine name is notable, it contains the tetragrammaton in Greek characters "Pipi". According to Jerome, some septuagint manuscripts had the Divine Name written in this way. Jerome mentions that some Greek manuscripts contain the Hebrew letters YHWH, he also comments that this Hebrew could mislead some Greek readers to read YHWH as "Pipi" (ΠΙΠΙ), since the letters YHWH (read right to left) look like "Pi Iota Pi Iota" (read left to right) in Greek. This transitional combination represents the Tetragrammaton in Ps 22:20 [LXX 21:20] in three separate ways in the Septuagint column of Origen’s Hexapla, preserved in a palimpsest in the Cairo Genizah."

Actual location 
Today it is kept at the Library of the University of Cambridge as a part of the Taylor-Schechter Cairo Genizah Collection (Cambridge University Library T-S 12.182).

See also 
 Septuagint manuscripts
 Ambrosiano O 39 sup.
 Hexapla

References

Sources

External links 
Cambridge University Library T-S 12.182 on Cambridge Digital Library
'The oldest fragment of Origen's Hexapla: T-S 12.182', Genizah Research Unit's Fragment of the Month
 A description of T-S 12.182
Image 1
University Library Taylor-Schechter Collection 12.182.jpg Image 2

7th-century biblical manuscripts
Manuscripts in Cambridge
Manuscripts from the Cairo Geniza
Works by Origen